LaGuardo is an unincorporated community in Wilson County, Tennessee. It is located along Tennessee State Route 109.  The community has a handful of stores, utility district building and churches.

History
LaGuardo means "watchdog."  An early spelling of the community was "Lagad" or "Lagado."  In 1950 the center of the community was moved from Saundersville Road and Woods Ferry road to a mile southeast.  This was due to damming of Old Hickory Lake and the increasing prominence of State Route 109.

Notable deaths
 Uncle Jimmy Thompson, old-time fiddle player, died February 17, 1931

Gallery

Notes

Unincorporated communities in Wilson County, Tennessee
Unincorporated communities in Tennessee